Wendy Lynn Schaeffer, OAM (born 16 September 1974 in Adelaide, South Australia) is an Australian equestrian and Olympic champion. She won a team gold medal in eventing at the 1996 Summer Olympics in Atlanta. Schaeffer was inducted into the Sport Australia Hall of Fame in 2002.

References

External links

1974 births
Living people
Australian female equestrians
Olympic equestrians of Australia
Equestrians at the 1996 Summer Olympics
Olympic gold medalists for Australia
Australian event riders
People from Adelaide
People educated at Pembroke School, Adelaide
Australian people of German descent
Olympic medalists in equestrian
Recipients of the Medal of the Order of Australia
Sport Australia Hall of Fame inductees
Medalists at the 1996 Summer Olympics